Bokermannohyla ahenea is a species of frogs in the family Hylidae. It is endemic to the Serra do Mar in São Paulo, Brazil. Its natural habitat is montane forest. While thought not to be rare, it is threatened by habitat loss caused by cattle pasture and agriculture including sugar, coffee and exotic trees. It has been recorded from the Serra da Bocaina National Park.

References

ahenea
Endemic fauna of Brazil
Amphibians of Brazil
Amphibians described in 2004
Taxonomy articles created by Polbot